Mumbai City Football Club is an Indian professional football club based in Mumbai, Maharashtra. The club was established on 30 August 2014 and began their first competitive season in the Indian Super League a few months later on 2014.

Club

All time performance record 
As of 13th March 2023

Season by season record 

Correct as the end of the 2021–22 season.

General 
Note: When scores are mentioned, score Mumbai City FC are given first.

 First match: 0–3 (vs ATK, 12 October 2014)
 First win: 5–0 (vs Pune City, Indian Super League, 18 October 2014)
 Biggest win (in Indian Super League):
 6–1 (vs Kerala Blasters FC, 16 December 2018)
 6-1 (vs Odisha FC, 24 February 2021)
 Biggest loss (in Indian Super League):
 0-7 (vs FC Goa, 17 November 2015)

 Highest scoring draw: 
3-3 (vs FC Goa, 8 February 2021 )
 3-3 (vs Hyderabad FC, 9 October 2022)
 Biggest win (in Super Cup): 2-1 (vs Indian Arrows, 16 March 2018)
 Biggest loss (in Super Cup): 0–2 (vs Chennaiyin FC,  2019)
 Biggest win (in Durand Cup): 5-1 (vs Rajasthan United, 29 August 2022)
 Biggest loss (in Durand Cup): 
3-4 (vs East Bengal FC, 3 September 2022)
1-2 (vs Bengaluru FC, 18 September 2022)
Biggest win (in AFC Champions League): 
2-1 (vs Al-Quwa Al-Jawiya, 11 April 2022)
1-0 (vs Al-Quwa Al-Jawiya, 26 April 2022)
Biggest loss (in AFC Champions League): 0-6 (vs Al Shabab FC), 18 April 2022)
 Most wins in an ISL season:14 (out of 20 games), during the 2022-23 season
 Fewest wins in an ISL season:4 (out of 14 games), during the 2014 and 2015 season
 Most defeats in an ISL season:9 (out of 18 matches), during the 2017-18 season
 Fewest defeats in an ISL season:2 (out of 20 matches), during the 2022-23 season
 Most goals scored in an ISL season:54 goals in 20 games, during the 2022-23 season
 Fewest goals scored in an ISL season:14 goals in 14 games, during the 2014 season
 Most goals conceded in an ISL season:32 goals in 18 games, during the 2019-20 season
 Fewest goals conceded in an ISL season:11 goals in 14 games, during the 2014 season
 Highest goal difference in a single ISL season:+33  in 20 games, during the 2022-23 season
 Most points in an ISL season:46 in 20 games, during the 2022-23 season
 Fewest points in an ISL season:16 in 14 games, during the 2014 and 2015 seasons

 Highest attendance: 28000 (vs Pune City, 18 October 2014)
 Highest average home attendance in a season :22712 (2015)

Team Records
League winners (2016) (2020–21)  (2022–23)
Fewest goals conceded in a season: (11), Mumbai City (2016) (2020-21)
Highest Points tally in the Indian Super League (46 Points) (2022-23) (also an ISL record)
Quickest League Shield winners in Indian Super League history (18) Games (2022-23)
Quickest semi-final qualification in Indian Super League history (15) Games (2020-21)
Most no. of goals scored by a team in a single season (54) Goals Mumbai City (2022-23)
Most no. of goals scored by Indian players in a single season (25) Goals Mumbai City (2022-23)
Most Number of Wins in Indian Super League (76 Wins)  (as of 13th March 2023)
Most consecutive away wins in a single Indian Super League season (8 Wins) 
 Longest winning streak in an ISL season:11 , during the 2022-23 season
 Longest unbeaten streak in an ISL season:18 , during the 2022-23 season
Record no. of Goalscorers from a single team Mumbai City (13) Goalscorers (54) Goals  (2022-23)
First team to score 5 goals in a single game v/s FC Pune City on 18 October 2014 at  DY Patil Stadium
Most Clean Sheets in Indian Super League by a Club : Total 58 Mumbai City (as of 13 March 2023)
Biggest Away Win in Indian Super League v/s Odisha FC on 24 February 2021 at GMC stadium Bambolim
Most passes by a Team in Indian Super League Mumbai City (807)Passes v/s Odisha FC on 24 February 2021 at GMC stadium Bambolim
Most Passes completed by a Team in Indian Super League Mumbai City (714)Passes v/s Odisha FC on 24 February 2021 at GMC stadium Bambolim

Players

Appearances
Most appearances:Bipin Singh 100
Most appearances as captain Amrinder Singh -

youngest Goalscorer : Pranjal Bhumij 19 Years 7 Months 3 Days v/s Kerala Blasters FC on 5 October 2018
Oldest GoalScorer : Diego Forlán 37 years 06 months v/s Kerala Blasters FC on 19 November 2016
Most goals scored overall – 22, Bipin Singh 2018–23
Most goals scored in a season – 17, Lallianzuala Chhangte 2022-23

Managerial

References

Mumbai City FC-related lists
Mumbai